A bio satellite is an  artificial satellite designed to carry plants or animals in outer space. They are used to research the effects of space (cosmic radiation, weightlessness, etc.) on biological matter while in orbit around a celestial body. The first satellite carrying an animal (a dog, "Laika") was Soviet Sputnik 2 on November 3, 1957. On August 20, 1960 Soviet Sputnik 5 launched and recovered dogs from Earth orbit. 

NASA launched 3 satellites between 1966 and 1969 for the Biosatellite program.

The most famous biosatellites include:
 Biosatellite program launched by NASA between 1966 and 1969.
 Bion space program by Soviet Union
 The Mars Gravity Biosatellite
 Orbiting Frog Otolith (OFO-A)

See also

 Animals in space
 Biosatellite (NASA)

References

Satellites by type
Animals in space